is a train station in the city of Takaoka, Toyama Prefecture, Japan. It is the newest station of the Himi Line operated by West Japan Railway Company.

Lines

Layout
Etchū-Kokubu Station consists of a single ground-level side platform, serving a single bi-directional track. The station is unattended.

The station is an unstaffed station with one side platform serving one track.

History
Etchū-Kokubu Station was opened on July 1, 1953. With the privatization of the JNR on April 1, 1987, the station came under the control of the West Japan Railway Company.

Adjacent stations

Passenger statistics
In fiscal 2015, the station was used by an average of 280 passengers daily (boarding passengers only).

Data for previous years is as follows:

Surrounding area

Between this station and neighbouring Amaharashi Station there are views on the right-hand side when heading towards Himi Station. These include views of the reefs of Otokoiwa, Onnaiwa and Yoshitsuneiwa located in the Sea of Japan.
The surrounding area also contains Toyoma-ken Ritsushiki Senior High School, Japan National Route 415 and Koshi no Niwa onsen.

References

External links

  

Railway stations in Toyama Prefecture
Stations of West Japan Railway Company
Railway stations in Japan opened in 1953
Himi Line
Takaoka, Toyama